Ravenscroft School is a coed independent school located in Raleigh, North Carolina. The school enrolls students between PreKindergarten and 12th grade, and serves 1,239 students. The school has three divisions: Lower School, Middle School and Upper School.

History 

Ravenscroft is named for John Stark Ravenscroft, the first Episcopal bishop of North Carolina and first rector of Christ Episcopal Church in Raleigh, North Carolina. The idea of a parish school for Christ Episcopal Church was born when Josiah Ogden Watson bequeathed $5,000 to the church to employ a teacher for a new parish school in 1852.  His silent bequest became known in 1862, and the church began the process of opening a new school – Ravenscroft School.  Founded in 1862, Ravenscroft continued under the auspices of Christ Episcopal Church until 1966 when it became non-sectarian.  Housed in locations such as Raleigh's Christ Church, St. Saviour's Chapel and on Tucker Street, Ravenscroft moved to its current location in 1969 with plans to expand to include a high school. At the same time, in 1969, Ravenscroft graduated the last 8th grade class from the Tucker Street. In 1971, the dedication of the Middle School and Upper School took place and, in 1973, Ravenscroft School graduated its first class of seniors.

Academics
Ravenscroft is an independent, co-educational college preparatory day school enrolling 1,239 students, pre-K through grade 12. Ravenscroft employs more than 250 faculty and staff.

The elementary school (referred to as the Lower School) has approximately 450 students ranging in grades from prekindergarten to 5th grade.

The Middle School at Ravenscroft serves approximately 300 students in grades 6th through 8th. The Middle School operates on an 8 day cycle, during which each course meets 6 times with a long session.

The high school (referred to as the Upper School) has over 470 students.  In the 2019-20 school year, 273 students took 558 advanced placement exams. The Upper School operates on an 8 day cycle, during which each course meets 6 times. Each student has a study hall built into their schedule.

Fine arts
Arts education includes Band, Choir, Drama, Strings, Visual Arts, Photography, Lower School Ensembles and Group Violin, as well as private lessons made available to students of all ages.  Facilities include the 454-seat Jones Theatre and a 180-seat "black-box" Young People's Theatre, as well as numerous studios and practice rooms.

Athletics

Ravenscroft's Athletic department offers 25 sports (boys and girls), and fields 53 teams in those sports at the Middle School, junior varsity and varsity levels. More than 80 percent of Ravenscroft students in grades 7–12 participate in school-sponsored athletics. The school mascot is a Raven named Edgar, after Edgar Allan Poe's poem The Raven.

Facilities include:  Aquatic Center with 6 lanes and upper deck viewing, 4 gyms, fitness and weight training facility, 3 lighted stadiums, 6 lighted tennis courts, 8-lane rubberized track, 2 wrestling rooms.

Ravenscroft is a member of the North Carolina Independent Schools Athletic Association (NCISAA) and competes in the 4A division.

NCISAA Championships

2016 NCISAA Girls' Swimming State Champions (4th time in a row)

2016 NCISAA Boys Lacrosse State Champions

2015 NCISAA Football State Champions

2012 NCISAA Boys Basketball State Champions

2013 NCISAA Girls Lacrosse State Champions

Notable alumni
Andy Andrews, former professional tennis player
Nathan Baskerville, member of the North Carolina House of Representatives
Anderson Boyd, filmmaker
Cameron Castleberry, professional women's soccer player
Isaac Copeland, professional basketball player
Anton Gill, professional basketball player
Nora Grossman, film producer
Michael C. Hall, actor best known for his roles in Six Feet Under and Dexter
Antwan Harris, NFL safety who won three Super Bowls with the New England Patriots
Neal Hunt, Republican member of the North Carolina General Assembly from the 15th district
Ryan Kelly, NBA player
Armistead Maupin, author
Emily Procter, actress best known for her roles in CSI: Miami and The West Wing
Hughes Winborne, Oscar-winning editor of Crash
Smedes York, former mayor of the city of Raleigh, North Carolina
Kofie Yeboah, popular internet personality and video producer for SB Nation, known for his work on the popular series "Fumble Dimension" with Jon Bois.
English Bernhardt, actress best known for playing Cady Heron in the Mean Girls U.S National Tour

References

External links
 

Private elementary schools in North Carolina
Episcopal schools in the United States
Private high schools in North Carolina
Private middle schools in North Carolina
Preparatory schools in North Carolina
Private schools in Raleigh, North Carolina
Educational institutions established in 1862
1862 establishments in North Carolina